KGBT may refer to:

 KGBT-TV, a television station (channel 4 virtual/18 digital) licensed to Harlingen, Texas, United States
 KGBT-FM, a radio station (98.5 FM) licensed to McAllen, Texas, United States
 KGBT (AM), a radio station (1530 AM) licensed to Harlingen, Texas, United States